The Kadina-Brinkworth railway line was a railway line on the South Australian Railways network.

History
The first section of the line opened on 1 October 1879 from Kadina to Snowtown, branching off from the Balaklava-Moonta line. It was extended to Brinkworth on 2 July 1894 where it joined the Hamley Bridge-Gladstone line.

The section from Kadina to Snowtown was converted to dual gauge on 2 December 1982 with an extra  rail laid following the conversion of the Adelaide-Port Augusta line. The Snowtown to Brinkworth section closed on 20 February 1990 followed by the rest of the line on 3 March 1993.

References

Closed railway lines in South Australia
Railway lines opened in 1879
Railway lines closed in 1993